The 2008 Phillip Island Superbike World Championship round was the 2nd round of the 2008 Superbike World Championship season. It took place on the weekend of 29 February – 2 March 2008, at the Phillip Island Grand Prix Circuit near Cowes, Victoria, Australia.

Superbike race 1 classification

Superbike race 2 classification

Supersport race classification

References

Phillip Island
Motorsport at Phillip Island
Superbike World Championship round